Saint Arsenije Sremac Serbian Orthodox Church (Serbian: Српска православна црква Светог Арсенија Сремца) is a Serbian Orthodox church located in Whitby, Ontario, Canada.

It is the only church dedicated to Saint Arsenije of Srem, the second Archbishop of the Serbian Orthodox Church and a disciple of Saint Sava.

History
The Saint Arsenije Sremac Serbian Orthodox Church and School Congregation of Whitby contains one parish which reaches the far east parts of the Greater Toronto Area: Whitby, Ajax, Oshawa, Pickering and Scarborough and the east all the way to Kingston.

In December 1969, the Bishop of Eastern America and Canada Sava (Vuković) – as requested of him by a number of residents of Oshawa – gave his blessing for the formation of a Church and School Congregation to be named after Saint Arsenije Sremac.

A number of Serb enthusiasts began the attempt to form a membership for the Church and School Congregation. As they didn't have the means to support a full-time priest, missionary priests would from time to time come to serve the Holy Liturgy in a rented church. This continued until the 1980s when the Church and School Congregation was closed and transferred over to the Saint Sava Serbian Orthodox Church and School Congregation of Toronto.

With the formation of the Serbian Orthodox Eparchy of Canada and the instalment of its first bishop Georgije (Đokić), there was again a wish to renew Serbian Orthodox Church life in Oshawa and its surrounding regions. At the annual diocesan meeting in Hamilton on February 5, 1993, approval was given to form the Saint Arsenije Sremac Serbian Orthodox Church and School Congregation in its borders all the way to Kingston. On the same day, the Diocesan Council and Diocesan Court announced the decision to formally make this Church and School Congregation.

Immediately upon forming the church community, it was decided to buy the Presbyterian church built 1859 in Whitby. The church was blessed on October 9, 1993 by Bishop Georgije. On the initiative of then-vice president of the Church and School Congregation Prvoslav Vujcic, the church was registered by the Town of Whitby as a heritage building. Before the blessing, the church was reordered for Orthodox usage. After the arrival of a full-time priest, the iconostasis was made by iconographer Dragomir "Dragan" Marunić. An altar was made along with two choir stands, places for candles and icons along with a church store. After that, with the donations of parishioners, everything else needed for an Orthodox church was bought. A cupola was installed in July 2012.

See also
 Serbian Orthodox Eparchy of Canada
 Holy Transfiguration Monastery
 Serbian Canadians

References

External links
 

Churches in Ontario
Designated heritage properties in Ontario
Serbian Orthodox church buildings in Canada
Eastern Orthodox church buildings in Canada
Church buildings with domes
Serbian-Canadian culture